Liz is a surname. Notable people with the surname include:

 Adé Liz, Ivorian singer
 Gabriela Liz (born 1961), Argentine field hockey player
 Manuel Liz (born 1989), Portuguese footballer
 Radhames Liz (born 1983), Dominican baseball pitcher, formerly in Major League Baseball
 Víctor Liz (born 1986), Dominican basketball player